Jade Anderson (born January 4, 1984), known professionally as Hollywood Jade, is a Canadian dancer and choreographer best known for his regular appearances on the reality television series Canada's Drag Race.

He began his career as a choreographer for drag queen Michelle Ross, and as a dancer in films such as Save the Last Dance 2, Camp Rock 2: The Final Jam, Turn the Beat Around, Make Your Move and Hairspray. After facing some barriers in his career due to his queer sexual identity and willingness to blur the sometimes-rigid lines of gender presentation in dance, he launched his own dance company in 2011, with his first self-produced show being one which blended hip hop dance with burlesque dance.

He has also done music video work for artists including Snoop Dogg, Keshia Chanté, Meghan Trainor, Estelle, Lil Wayne, Brooke Lynn Hytes and Priyanka, and has been the permanent artistic director and choreographer for Jully Black.

In 2021, he performed on FreeUp! The Emancipation Day Special.

References

External links

1984 births
Living people
Canadian male dancers
Canadian choreographers
Black Canadian male actors
Black Canadian LGBT people
Canadian LGBT actors
LGBT dancers
LGBT choreographers
Black Canadian dancers
Participants in Canadian reality television series
Canadian people of Jamaican descent
Canadian people of Guyanese descent